The 2015 IBSF World Snooker Championship is an amateur snooker tournament that took place from 9 November to 21 November 2015 in Hurghada, Egypt.

The event was originally due to take place in Sharm el-Sheikh, however due to the Metrojet Flight 9268 crash the tournament was relocated to Hurghada. Because of this many competitors withdrew from the competition amid safety fears, Including the entire Qatari, Moroccan and English teams, the latter of which would have featured former world champion Reanne Evans.

The tournament was won by 10th seed Wendy Jans who defeated Anastasia Nechaeva 5–1 in the final. This victory was Jans fourth consecutive tournament win and her fifth overall.

Results

Group round

Group A

Group B

Group C

Group D

Group E

Group F

Knockout rounds

References

2015 in snooker
Snooker amateur tournaments
Hurghada
2015 in Egyptian sport
International sports competitions hosted by Egypt